Rosedale Chimney Bank or just Chimney Bank is a hill pass that carries a minor road between Rosedale Abbey and Hutton-le-Hole in the Ryedale district of the North York Moors National Park, North Yorkshire, England. The tarmacked highway shares the title of steepest road in England (the other is Hardknott Pass in Cumbria).

The pass has an average gradient of 13%, with a maximum gradient of 1 in 3 (about 33%) and climbs  on its  route. It is colloquially known by cyclists as The Chain Breaker.

In 1987 it was used as the venue for the National Hill Climb Championship. 

The mine closed in 1929, but its chimney remained until it was demolished on 28 July 1972.

See also
List of hill passes of the Lake District

References
Citations

External links
How to climb Rosedale Chimney (video)

Roads in Yorkshire
Scenic routes in the United Kingdom
Ironstone Mines in North Yorkshire